Mirificarma monticolella is a moth of the family Gelechiidae. It is found in Italy and Albania.

The wingspan is 6.5–7 mm for males. The head is cream. The forewings are cream mottled with brown, but predominantly cream in the central area of the wing. Adults are on wing in May and June.

References

Moths described in 1931
Mirificarma
Moths of Europe